The naked-rumped pouched bat (Saccolaimus saccolaimus), also known as the pouched tomb bat, is a species of sac-winged bat in the family Emballonuridae.

Taxonomy
Described in 1838 by Coenraad Temminck. the author assigned the species to a new genus. The type location is in Indonesia.

The uncertain diversity of related populations is represented by five subspecies,
 species Saccolaimus saccolaimus Temminck, 1838.
 subspecies Saccolaimus saccolaimus saccolaimus
 subspecies Saccolaimus saccolaimus affinis
 subspecies Saccolaimus saccolaimus crassus
 subspecies Saccolaimus saccolaimus nudicluniatus De Vis, 1905.
 subspecies Saccolaimus saccolaimus pluto
The form nudicluniatus described by De Vis in 1905, a population found in Queensland, was formerly recognised as Saccolaimus  nudicluniatus.

Description 
It has dark-reddish brown or blackish-brown upper parts which are irregularly marked with white patches. Their underparts are usually white, but in one colour phase it can be dark brown. They have no wing pouch or in other words, a poorly developed radio-metacarpal pouch. They have a distinct glandular pouch on the throat. The ear is short and broadly rounded with ribbing on the interior of the pinna with a short tragus which has a semicircular margin. It has long and narrow wings with black skin and translucent whitish portions. It is the largest species with the whitest wings.

Distribution 
The bat is found in India and Sri Lanka through South-East Asia to Borneo, Sumatra, Java and Timor, New Guinea, North-East Queensland (Australia), and Guadalcanal. The species seems to no longer be present in Australia.  Bat-detector observations suggest that the species is very common in western Java, whereas further in the east (e.g. Bali) it is less common and its relative Taphozous melanopogon dominates in dry and coastal areas.

Biology and ecology 
This medium-sized bat roosts in hollow trees and rock crevices and sometimes houses in colonies varying from a few individuals to a few hundred. Roosting bats maintain individual spacing. They are alert at the roost and scurry all over the roost substrate if disturbed. Echolocation clicks produced by this bat in flight are audible. females give birth to a single young per litter. Bat-detector observations have revealed this species to be common in cities, villages, above rice fields, other (wet) cultivated areas and forest edges and has been heard up to 2000m in mountainous areas. This species is not commonly heard hunting over continuous forest. It is one of the earliest species to emerge and can often be seen hunting together with swiftlets about 15–40 metres above the ground, estimated from frequent visual observations. The build of this species suggests it to be an open-air forager. Individuals are usually seen hunting in wide circles over several hundred of metres. They have been seen feeding on termite swarms when available.

References

Further reading
Murphy S. (2002) Observations of the 'Critically Endangered' bare-rumped sheathtail bat Saccolaimus saccolaimus Temminck (Chiroptera: Emballonuridae) on Cape York Peninsula, Queensland. Australian Mammalogy 23: 185–187.

Naked-Rumped Pouched
Naked-Rumped Pouched
Naked-Rumped Pouched
Naked-Rumped Pouched
Naked-Rumped Pouched
Naked-Rumped Pouched
Naked-Rumped Pouched
Mammals of Bangladesh
Mammals of India
Mammals of Sri Lanka
Mammals of the Northern Territory
Fauna of Sumatra
Mammals of Brunei
Mammals of Cambodia
Mammals of Vietnam
Mammals of the Philippines
Mammals of Myanmar
Mammals of Thailand
Mammals of the Solomon Islands
Naked-Rumped Pouched
Taxonomy articles created by Polbot
Taxa named by Coenraad Jacob Temminck
Bats of New Guinea